Second Mnangagwa cabinet is the government of Zimbabwe led by Emmerson Mnangagwa and formed on 10 September 2018.

Cabinet composition

|}

References

Government of Zimbabwe
Zimbabwe
Mnangagwa